Mormon Peak is the highest mountain in the Mormon Mountains of Lincoln County in Nevada, United States. It is the most topographically prominent peak in Lincoln County and ranks twenty-fourth among the most topographically prominent peaks in Nevada. The peak is on public land administered by the Bureau of Land Management and thus has no access restrictions.

References

See also 
 Mormon Mountains

Mountains of Nevada
Landforms of Lincoln County, Nevada